Christophe Landrin (born 30 June 1977 in Roubaix) is a French football midfielder. His brother, Sebastien, is one of the main players of the French national rink hockey team.

Honours
Lille
UEFA Intertoto Cup: 2004

Paris Saint-Germain
Coupe de France: 2005–06

References

External links

France U-21 season 1996–97 (Toulon tournament)

1977 births
Living people
French footballers
France under-21 international footballers
Association football midfielders
Lille OSC players
Paris Saint-Germain F.C. players
AS Saint-Étienne players
AC Arlésien players
Ligue 1 players
Ligue 2 players